Joan Cummings may refer to;

 Joan Cummings, a character from the US soap Sunset Beach played by Carol Potter (see List of Sunset Beach characters)
 Joan Cummings, a reporter on BBC Midlands Today